In mathematics, particularly p-adic analysis, the p-adic exponential function is a p-adic analogue of the usual exponential function on the complex numbers. As in the complex case, it has an inverse function, named the p-adic logarithm.

Definition
The usual exponential function on C is defined by the infinite series

Entirely analogously, one defines the exponential function on Cp, the completion of the algebraic closure of Qp, by

However, unlike exp which converges on all of C, expp only converges on the disc

This is because p-adic series converge if and only if the summands tend to zero, and since the n! in the denominator of each summand tends to make them large p-adically, a small value of z is needed in the numerator.

Although the p-adic exponential is sometimes denoted ex, the number e itself has no p-adic analogue.

p-adic logarithm function

The power series

converges for x in Cp satisfying |x|p < 1 and so defines the p-adic logarithm function logp(z) for |z − 1|p < 1 satisfying the usual property logp(zw) = logpz + logpw. Specifically, every element w of  can be written as w = pr·ζ·z with r a rational number, ζ a root of unity, and |z − 1|p < 1, in which case logp(w) = logp(z).

Properties

If z and w are both in the radius of convergence for expp, then their sum is too and we have the usual addition formula: expp(z + w) = expp(z)expp(w).

Similarly if z and w are nonzero elements of Cp then logp(zw) = logpz + logpw.

For z in the domain of expp, we have expp(logp(1+z)) = 1+z and logp(expp(z)) = z.

The roots of the Iwasawa logarithm logp(z) are exactly the elements of Cp of the form pr·ζ where r is a rational number and ζ is a root of unity.

Note that there is no analogue in Cp of Euler's identity, e2πi = 1.  This is a corollary of Strassmann's theorem.

Another major difference to the situation in C is that the domain of convergence of expp is much smaller than that of logp.  A modified exponential function — the Artin–Hasse exponential — can be used instead which converges on |z|p < 1.

Notes

References

 Chapter 12 of

External links
 p-adic exponential and p-adic logarithm

Exponentials
p-adic numbers